Cuts From the Crypt is a collection of demos, formerly unreleased tracks and cover songs by the American horror punk band Misfits. All the album's tracks were recorded by the band in the years following their reformation without original singer Glenn Danzig. The enhanced version also contains the music video for the song "Scream!".

Track listing

Personnel

Band 
 Michale Graves – vocals, backing vocals on "Monster Mash"
 Jerry Only – bass, backing vocals, lead vocals on "Monster Mash"
 Doyle Wolfgang von Frankenstein – guitar
 Dr. Chud – drums

Additional musicians 
 John Cafiero – vocals on "I Wanna Be a NY Ranger"
 Dez Cadena – guitar and vocals on "Rise Above"
 Robo – drums on "Rise Above"

References 

Misfits (band) compilation albums
2001 compilation albums
Roadrunner Records compilation albums
Horror punk compilation albums
Albums with cover art by Pushead